There are several places in Australia called Stirling:
 Stirling, Western Australia, a suburb of Perth
 City of Stirling, a local government area of Perth
 Stirling, South Australia, a city and region just east of Adelaide
 Stirling, Australian Capital Territory, a suburb in Canberra
 Division of Stirling, a federal electorate centred on the city of Stirling.
 Electoral district of Stirling, a state electoral district in Western Australia near the city of Albany.
 Stirling Range, a range of mountains in Western Australia north-east the city of Albany